Paul Walker was an American actor. The following were his roles in film, television and music videos.

Film

Television

Music videos

References

American filmographies
Male actor filmographies